The Santa Clara Pueblo (Tewa: Kha'p'oe Ówîngeh) is an Indian reservation in north-central New Mexico, United States. It is the homeland of a branch of the Pueblo people (Tewa) of Native Americans. The reservation lies on 76.73 sq mi (198.729 km²) of southern Rio Arriba, northeastern Sandoval, and northern Santa Fe Counties. It includes the community (census designated place) of Santa Clara Pueblo, as well as parts of three other communities. The total population living on Santa Clara Pueblo land as of the 2000 census was 10,658 persons. Most of the population lives in the northeastern corner of the reservation. The largest community on reservation land is the city of Española, although a part of the city is not on reservation territory.

Communities
Española (most, population 5,681)
Santa Clara Pueblo
Santa Cruz (part, population 266)
Sombrillo (part, population 157)

References
Santa Clara Pueblo, New Mexico United States Census Bureau

 
American Indian reservations in New Mexico
Native American tribes in New Mexico
Jemez Mountains
Geography of Rio Arriba County, New Mexico
Geography of Sandoval County, New Mexico
Geography of Santa Fe County, New Mexico